Warren Isbell Lee (February 5, 1876 – December 25, 1955) was a U.S. Representative from New York.

Life
He was born in Bartlett, Oneida County, New York. In 1894 he graduated from Colgate Academy in Hamilton, New York.  He graduated from Hamilton College in 1899, and from New York Law School in 1901. He was admitted to the bar in 1901, and practiced in New York City.

He was a member of the New York State Assembly (Kings Co., 18th D.) in 1906, 1907, 1908, 1909, 1910. He was an assistant district attorney of Kings County from 1912 to 1914; First Deputy New York State Comptroller from 1914 to 1917; one of the counsel to the state Public Service Commission from 1917 to 1919; and a Trustee of Hamilton College from 1917 to 1921.

He was again a member of the State Assembly (Kings Co., 21st D.) in 1920; and a delegate to the Republican state conventions in 1920, 1922, 1924 and 1926.

Lee was elected as a Republican to the 67th United States Congress, holding office from March 4, 1921, to March 3, 1923. Afterwards he resumed the practice of law, and was a director of Flatbush National Bank.

He died on December 25, 1955, in Brooklyn; and was buried at the Green-Wood Cemetery there.

References

External links

1876 births
1955 deaths
Burials at Green-Wood Cemetery
Hamilton College (New York) alumni
New York Law School alumni
Republican Party members of the New York State Assembly
Politicians from Brooklyn
Republican Party members of the United States House of Representatives from New York (state)